Johan van Scheepen is a Dutch botanist.

Career 
Educated at Leiden University, Van Scheepen has worked at the University of Reading as a research fellow (1982-1985) and the Ministerie van Landbouw en Visserij (1985-1988). Since 1989 he has been a taxonomist and registrar for the ICRA (International Cultivar Registration Authorities) at KAVB (Royal General Bulbgrowers Association) in the Netherlands.

References 

Living people
20th-century Dutch botanists
21st-century Dutch botanists
Leiden University alumni
Year of birth missing (living people)